Singapore competed at the 2015 World Aquatics Championships in Kazan, Russia from 24 July to 9 August 2015. This was the first time Singapore won a medal at the World Aquatics Championship, with Joseph Schooling winning bronze in the  Men's 100 m butterfly event.

Medalists

Diving

Singaporean divers qualified for the individual spots and synchronized teams at the World Championships.

Women

Swimming

Singaporean swimmers have achieved qualifying standards in the following events (up to a maximum of 2 swimmers in each event at the A-standard entry time, and 1 at the B-standard): Swimmers must qualify at the 2015 Singapore Championships and Southeast Asian Games (for pool events) to confirm their places for the Worlds.

The Singaporean team consists of 11 swimmers (five men and six women), all coached by former Spanish breaststroker and 1988 Olympic bronze medalist Sergio Lopez Miro. Among the official roster featured U.S.-based swimmer and Asian Games champion Joseph Schooling and Olympic siblings Quah Zheng Wen and Quah Ting Wen.

Men

Women

Mixed

Synchronized swimming

Singapore fielded a full squad of eight synchronized swimmers to compete in each of the following events.

References

External links
Singapore Swimming Federation

Nations at the 2015 World Aquatics Championships
2015 in Singaporean sport
Singapore at the World Aquatics Championships